Choerophryne proboscidea is a species of frog in the family Microhylidae. It is found in West Papua in Indonesia and Papua New Guinea. Its natural habitat is subtropical or tropical moist lowland forests.

References

External links

proboscidea
Amphibians of New Guinea
Taxa named by Pieter Nicolaas van Kampen
Taxonomy articles created by Polbot
Amphibians described in 1914